ProSet is a set theoretic programming language that is being developed at the University of Essen as a successor to SETL. It is a very-high level language that supports prototyping.

ProSet provides the following first-class data types: atom, integer, real, string, boolean, tuple, set. Functions and modules are also first-class.

References

Set theoretic programming languages